Jeff "Tain" Watts (born January 20, 1960) is a jazz drummer who has performed with Wynton Marsalis, Branford Marsalis, Betty Carter, Michael Brecker, Alice Coltrane, Ravi Coltrane, and others.

Biography
Watts got the nickname "Tain" from Kenny Kirkland when they were on tour in Florida and drove past a Chieftain gas station. He was given a Guggenheim fellowship in music composition in 2017. Watts attended Berklee College of Music, where he met collaborator Branford Marsalis.

Discography

As leader
 Megawatts (Sunnyside, 1991)
 Citizen Tain (Columbia, 1999)
 Bar Talk (Columbia, 2002)
 Detained at the Blue Note (Half Note, 2004)
 Folks Songs (Dark Key Music, 2011)
 Watts (Dark Key Music, 2009)
 Family (Dark Key Music, 2011)
 Blue, Vol. 1 (Dark Key Music, 2015)
 Blue, Vol. 2 (Dark Key Music, 2018)
 Detained in Amsterdam (Dark Key Music, 2018)

As sideman 

With John Beasley'
 Letter to Herbie (Resonance, 2008)
 Positootly! (Resonance, 2009)

With Paul Bollenback
 Double Gemini (Challenge, 1997)
 Soul Grooves (Challenge, 1999)
 Double Vision (Challenge, 2000)
 Dreams (Challenge, 2001)

With Michael Brecker
 Two Blocks from the Edge (Impulse!, 1998)
 Time Is of the Essence (Verve, 1999)

With Joey Calderazzo
 Simply Music (Lost Chart, 1997)
 Joey Calderazzo (Columbia, 2000)

With Charles Fambrough'
 The Proper Angle (CTI, 1991)
 The Charmer (CTI, 1992)

With Kenny Garrett
 Songbook (Warner, Bros., 1997)
 Simply Said (Warner, Bros., 1999)

With Jimmy Greene
 Forever (Criss Cross, 2004)
 Flowers Beautiful Life Vol. 2 (Mack Avenue, 2017)

With David Gilmore
 Unified Presence (RKM Music, 2006)
 Numerology Live at Jazz Standard (Evolutionary Music, 2012)

With Conrad Herwig
 Osteology (Criss Cross, 1998)
 Unseen Universe (Criss Cross, 2000)
 Land of Shadow (Criss Cross, 2002)
 Reflections (Criss Cross, 2016)

With Stanley Jordan
 Cornucopia (Blue Note, 1990)
 Live in New York (Blue Note, 1998)

With David Kikoski
 The Maze (Criss Cross, 1999)
 Almost Twilight (Criss Cross, 2000)
 Combinations (Criss Cross, 2001)
 Surf's Up (Criss Cross, 2001)
 The Five (DIW, 2002)
 Mostly Standards (Criss Cross, 2009)
 Consequences (Criss Cross, 2012)

With Joe Locke
 Beauty Burning (Sirocco, 2000)
 Storytelling (Sirocco, 2001)

With Branford Marsalis
 Scenes in the City (Columbia, 1984)
 Royal Garden Blues (CBS, 1986)
 Random Abstract (1988)
 Trio Jeepy (Columbia, 1989)
 Crazy People Music  (Columbia, 1990)
 Mo' Better Blues (Columbia, 1990)
 The Beautyful Ones Are Not Yet Born (Columbia, 1991)
 I Heard You Twice the First Time (Columbia, 1992)
 Bloomington (Columbia, 1993)
 The Dark Keys (Columbia, 1996)
 Requiem  (Columbia, 1999)
 Contemporary Jazz (Columbia, 2000)
 Footsteps of Our Fathers (Rounder/Marsalis Music, 2002)
 Romare Bearden Revealed (Rounder/Marsalis Music, 2003)
 A Love Supreme Live (Rounder/Marsalis Music, 2004)
 Eternal (Rounder, 2004)
 Braggtown (Rounder/Marsalis Music, 2006)
 Metamorphosen (Marsalis Music, 2009)

With Ellis Marsalis Jr.'
 Ellis Marsalis Trio (Somethin' Else, 1991)
 Whistle Stop (CBS, 1994)

With Wynton Marsalis
 Wynton Marsalis (Columbia, 1982)
 Think of One (CBS, 1983)
 Hot House Flowers (Columbia, 1984)
 Black Codes (From the Underground) (Columbia, 1985)
 J Mood (Columbia, 1986)
 Marsalis Standard Time, Vol. I (Columbia, 1987)
 The Wynton Marsalis Quartet Live at Blues Alley (CBS, 1988)

 Standard Time, Vol. 2: Intimacy Calling (Columbia, 1991)
 Thick in the South: Soul Gestures in Southern Blue, Vol. 1 (Columbia, 1991)

With Mingus Big Band
 Tonight at Noon... Three or Four Shades of Love (Dreyfus, 2002)
 Mingus Big Band Live at Jazz Standard (Mingus, 2010)

With Greg Osby
 Art Forum (Blue Note, 1996)
 Channel Three (Blue Note, 2005)

With Makoto Ozone
 Live & Let Live Love for Japan (Verve, 2011)
 My Witch's Blue (Verve, 2012)

With Danilo Perez
 Panamonk (Impulse!, 1996)
 Central Avenue (Impulse!, 1998)

With Courtney Pine
 The Vision's Tale (Antilles, 1989)
 Within the Realms of Our Dreams (Antilles, 1991)
 Underground (Talkin' Loud, 1997)

With Robert Stewart
 In the Gutta (Qwest, 1996)
 The Force (Qwest, 1998)

With Sadao Watanabe
 Parker's Mood (Elektra, 1985)
 Tokyo Dating (Elektra, 1985)

With Warren Wolf
 Black Wolf (M&I, 2009)
 Convergence (Mack Avenue, 2016)

With others
 Claudia Acuna, Rhythm of Life (Verve, 2002)
 Ron Affif, 52nd Street (Pablo, 1996)
 Geri Allen, The Nurturer (Blue Note, 1991)
 India Arie & Joe Sample, Christmas with Friends (Motown, 2015)
 Victor Bailey, Bottom's Up (Atlantic, 1989)
 Terence Blanchard, Terence Blanchard (Columbia, 1991)
 Michiel Borstlap, Gramercy Park (EmArcy, 2001)
 Robi Botos, Movin' Forward (A440, 2015)
 Don Braden, The Fire Within (RCA Victor, 1999)
 Donald Brown, Early Bird (Sunnyside, 1988)
 Billy Childs, The Child Within (Shanachie, 1996)
 Betty Carter, It's Not About the Melody (Verve, 1992)
 Steve Coleman, Weaving Symbolics (Label Bleu, 2006)
 Alice Coltrane, Translinear Light (Impulse!, 2004)
 Ravi Coltrane, Moving Pictures (BMG, 1998)
 Harry Connick Jr., When Harry Met Sally... (CBS, 1989)
 DR Big Band, The Impaler (Red Dot Music, 2010)
 Barbara Dennerlein, Outhipped (Universal, 1999)
 Doky Brothers, 2 Blue Note Medley (EMI, 1997)
 Chris Minh Doky, Cinematique (Blue Note, 2002)
 ELEW, And to the Republic (Sunnyside, 2016)
 Kurt Elling, The Questions (Okeh, 2018)
 Kevin Eubanks, East West Time Line (Mack Avenue, 2017)
 Robin Eubanks, Different Perspectives (JMT, 1988)
 Antonio Farao, Black Inside (Enja, 1999)
 Joe Ford, Today's Nights (Bluemoon, 1993)
 Ricky Ford, Hard Groovin' (Muse, 1989)
 Sonny Fortune, From Now On (Blue Note, 1996)
 Joe Gilman, Treasure Chest (Timeless, 1992)
 Paul Grabowsky, Tales of Time and Space (Warner, 2004)
 Lalah Hathaway, A Moment (Virgin, 1994)
 Robert Hurst, Robert Hurst Presents: Robert Hurst (Columbia, 1993)
 Rodney Jones, Dreams and Stories (Savant, 2005)
 Marlon Jordan, For You Only (Columbia, 1990)
 Ronny Jordan, A Brighter Day (Blue Note, 2000)
 Kenny Kirkland, Kenny Kirkland (GRP, 1991)
 Azar Lawrence, The Seeker (Sunnyside, 2014)
 Mark Ledford, Miles 2 Go (Verve Forecast 1998)
 Bill Lee, Do the Right Thing (Columbia, 1989)
 Buckshot LeFonque, Buckshot LeFonque (Columbia, 1994)
 Brian Lynch, Spheres of Influence (Sharp Nine, 1997)
 Russell Malone, Heartstrings (Verve, 2001)
 Rick Margitza, This Is New (Blue Note, 1991)
 Rene Marie, Vertigo (Maxjazz, 2001)
 Delfeayo Marsalis, Pontius Pilate's Decision (Novus, 1992)
 Hector Martignon, Refugee (Zoho, 2007)
 Pat Martino, Undeniable: Live at Blues Alley (HighNote, 2011)
 Harry Miller, Open House (Optimism, 1989)
 Bill Mobley, New Light (Space Time, 2008)
 Charnett Moffett, Music from Our Soul (Motema, 2017)
 Big Nick Nicholas, Big and Warm (India Navigation, 1983)
 Odean Pope, Odeans List (In+Out, 2009)
 Eric Revis, Tales of the Stuttering Mime (11:11, 2004)
 Jim Snidero, Mixed Bag (Criss Cross, 1988)
 Gary Thomas, Seventh Quadrant (Enja, 1987)
 Jean Toussaint, Blue Black (Space Time, 2001)
 Renee Rosnes, Life On Earth (Blue Note, 2001)
 Sonny Rollins, Falling in Love with Jazz (Milestone, 1989)
 Stephen Scott, Something to Consider (Verve, 1991)
 Lew Soloff, Rainbow Mountain (Enja, 1999)
 T. K. Blue, Eyes of the Elders (Arkadia, 2001)
 Take 6, Join the Band (Reprise, 1994)
 Alex Sipiagin, Steppin' Zone (Criss Cross, 2001)
 McCoy Tyner, Quartet (Half Note, 2007)
 Manuel Valera, Urban Landscape (Destiny, 2015)
 Mark Whitfield, True Blue (Verve, 1994)
 James Williams, Meet the Magical Trio (EmArcy, 1989)
 Larry Willis, Heavy Blue (SteepleChase, 1990)
 Ben Wolfe, No Stranger Here (Maxjazz, 2008)
 Chihiro Yamanaka, Outside by the Swing (Verve, 2005)

Awards and honors

Grammy Awards

Source:

References

External links

Review of Folk's Songs at JazzChicago.net
 

1960 births
Living people
American jazz drummers
African-American drummers
Musicians from Pittsburgh
Columbia Records artists
Berklee College of Music alumni
The Tonight Show Band members
American session musicians
20th-century American drummers
American male drummers
Jazz musicians from Pennsylvania
20th-century American male musicians
American male jazz musicians
Branford Marsalis Quartet members
Sunnyside Records artists
20th-century African-American musicians
21st-century African-American people